Cutmere is a hamlet in the parish of St Germans, Cornwall, England. It is in the civil parish of Quethiock

References

Hamlets in Cornwall